Tom Smith is an American singer-songwriter from Ann Arbor, Michigan, who got his start in the filk music community. He is a fourteen-time winner of the Pegasus Award for excellence in filking, including awards for his "A Boy and His Frog", "307 Ale", and "The Return of the King (Uh-huh)", and was inducted into the Filk Hall of Fame in 2005.

Career 
His nickname, "The World's Fastest Filker", comes from numerous instances of "instafilk", i.e., quickly-written or improvised songs.  He has improvised entire concert sets, and his album Badgers and Gophers and Squirrels Oh My: The 24-Hour Project, inspired by Scott McCloud's 24-Hour Comics Day, features seventeen songs written in twenty-four hours.  In May 2006, he released the album The Last Hero on Earth, a comic opera which has twenty songs, all written in one day, to the same plot.

In August 2006, emulating Jonathan Coulton's Thing a Week, he began iTom, a project where he released a new song every week for a year, and continued sporadically after that.  So far, he has collected four albums of those songs.

He has parodied Christine Lavin songs with her blessing.  He authored the official song for Talk Like a Pirate Day.
He wrote "Enterprising Man" for the animated parody video Babylon Park: Grudgematch, as well as the official Transylvania Polygnostic University theme song for the comic Girl Genius by Studio Foglio.

Smith performs frequently at conventions across the United States, and has also performed in Canada and England.  He has been featured frequently on Dr. Demento, Public Radio International's Sound & Spirit, and other radio programs. In 2007, he joined with comedy musicians such as Rob Balder, The Great Luke Ski, Sudden Death, Worm Quartet, and others in The FuMP (The Funny Music Project). Smith has appeared in concert with Dr. Demento and on the same bill as Chick Corea.

In 2005, "A Boy and His Frog" was the subject of a mini-arc in the Something Positive webcomic.

On June 7, 2008, Smith tore his quadriceps while attempting to take the stage at a Christine Lavin concert, landing him in the hospital and preventing him from performing for the next few months.

Discography

 Mr. Smith Goes to the Hospital (tribute album), 2008 (download)
 Songs of The FuMP, Vol. 1, 2008 (download)
 iTom 4.0: Smith and Legend, 2007 (download)
 iTom 3.0: True Love Waits, 2007 (download)
 iTom 2.0: Transitions, 2007 (download)
 iTom 1.0: And So It Begins, 2006 (download)
 The Last Hero on Earth, 2006 (CD)
 Sins of Commission, 2006 (download)
 Homecoming: MarCon 2005, 2005 (download)
 And They Say I've Got Talent, 2004 (CD)
 Badgers and Gophers and Squirrels Oh My: The 24-Hour Project, 2004 (download)
 Live at GAFilk, 2004 (download)
 Debasement Tapes, 1999 (CD)
 Plugged, 1997 (CD/cassette)
 Tom Smith and His Digital Acoustic Compilation, 1998 (CD from the two cassettes below)
 Domino Death, 1994 (cassette)
 Who Let Him In Here?, 1991 (cassette)

Pegasus Awards 
 Best Filk Song 1991: "A Boy and His Frog"

References

External links 
 Tom Smith Online
 Tom Smith on the FuMP
 Tom Smith albums on Bandcamp
 Cool Sci-Fi Stuff Review of Tom Smith Plugged & Stupid Filk Tricks on the SciFi Channel's website
 Live performance of "A Boy and His Frog" at DragonCon 2007
 

American male singer-songwriters
Filkers
Living people
Musicians from Ann Arbor, Michigan
American parodists
Parody musicians
Singer-songwriters from Michigan
Year of birth missing (living people)